Samardzija or Samardžija is a surname. Notable people with the surname include:

Bojan Samardžija (born 1985), Bosnian cross-country skier
Jeff Samardzija (born 1985), American baseball player
Miloš Samardžija (born 1920), Yugoslav economist
Zoran Samardžija (born 1962), Bosnian footballer